Olimpija Ljubljana are a Slovenian football club which are based in Ljubljana. During the 2017-18 campaign they will compete in the following competitions:Slovenian PrvaLiga, Slovenian Football Cup, UEFA Europa League.

Competitions

PrvaLiga

League table

Results summary

Results by matchday

Matches

Cup

Round of 16

Quarter-finals

Semi-finals

Final

Europa League

First qualifying round

References
General

Specific

External links
Official website 
Green dragons – Supporters 
PrvaLiga profile 
UEFA profile
Soccerway profile

NK Olimpija Ljubljana (2005) seasons
Olimpija